Graziano Mancinelli (18 February 1937 – 8 October 1992) was an Italian show jumping rider.

Biography
He competed at the 1964, 1968, 1972, 1976 and 1984 Olympics and won one gold and two bronze medals. He was initially banned from the 1964 Olympics, as he was considered a professional rider for the Milan horse-dealing company of Fratelli Rivolta, but the ban was lifted the day before the Olympics. Outside Olympics Mancinelli won a silver medal at the 1970 World Championships, a European title in 1963, and six national titles.

Awards
On 7 May 2015, in the presence of the President of Italian National Olympic Committee (CONI), Giovanni Malagò, was inaugurated in the Olympic Park of the Foro Italico in Rome, along Viale delle Olimpiadi, the Walk of Fame of Italian sport, consisting of 100 tiles that chronologically report names of the most representative athletes in the history of Italian sport. On each tile are the name of the sportsman, the sport in which he distinguished himself and the symbol of CONI. One of these tiles is dedicated to Graziano Mancinelli.

See also
 Legends of Italian sport - Walk of Fame

References

External links

1937 births
1992 deaths
Italian show jumping riders
Olympic equestrians of Italy
Italian male equestrians
Olympic gold medalists for Italy
Olympic bronze medalists for Italy
Equestrians at the 1964 Summer Olympics
Equestrians at the 1968 Summer Olympics
Equestrians at the 1972 Summer Olympics
Equestrians at the 1976 Summer Olympics
Equestrians at the 1984 Summer Olympics
Olympic medalists in equestrian
Medalists at the 1972 Summer Olympics
Medalists at the 1964 Summer Olympics